Carlos Humberto López Guzmán (born February 19, 1996, in Navolato, Sinaloa) is a Mexican professional footballer who currently plays for Cafetaleros de Chiapas Premier.

References

1996 births
Living people
Mexican footballers
Association football defenders
Chiapas F.C. footballers
Ocelotes UNACH footballers
Liga MX players
Liga Premier de México players
Tercera División de México players
Footballers from Sinaloa
People from Navolato Municipality